The National Health Commission (NHC) is a cabinet-level executive department of the State Council of the People's Republic of China which is responsible for formulating national health policies. It was formed on 19 March 2018. The ministry is headquartered in Beijing. The commission is led by a Minister of cabinet rank in the state council. Ma Xiaowei is the current Minister in charge of the Commission and Party Branch Secretary. Its predecessor was the National Health and Family Planning Commission.

History 
Throughout most of PRC's rule since 1954, the national health portfolio has been the responsibility of the Ministry of Health; superseded in 2013 by the National Health and Family Planning Commission.

In March 2018, the Government of the People's Republic of China announced that the National Health and Family Planning Commission was dissolved and that its functions were integrated into the new agency, the National Health Commission.

China is a member of the World Health Organization. Minister Ma reported in the 92nd World Health Assembly, since 1978, China has been focused on improving primary healthcare, develop universal safety net for residents and improving the quality, efficiency and access to primary health care.

2020 coronavirus epidemic 

The commission is the lead agency in mainland China coordinating the national efforts to combat the COVID-19 pandemic

On 11 February 2020, in order to manage the ongoing health crisis, the following changes were announced by the NHC :
 Zhang Jin, chief of the Hubei health commission, was replaced by Wang Hesheng, the deputy director of China National Health Commission.
 Liu Yingzi, director of the Hubei health commission, was replaced by Wang Hesheng.
In December 2022, a week after the NHC said it would no longer release official death tolls from Covid, the NHC said that "China has always been publishing information on Covid-19 deaths and severe cases in the spirit of openness and transparency."

Subordinate agencies 
The following agencies directly report to the commission.

 Sub-ministry-level executive agencies of the State Council aimistrated by the NHC
 National Administration of Traditional Chinese Medicine -  
 National Administration of Disease Control and Prevention

 Institutions directly under the NHC
 Chinese Center for Disease Control and Prevention - national institution for prevention and control of disease
 Chinese Academy of Medical Sciences  Peking Union Medical College

 Hospitals directly under the NHC
 
 China-Japan Friendship Hospital
 Peking Union Medical College Hospital

List of ministers

References 

Government ministries of the People's Republic of China
China
Ministries established in 2018
2018 establishments in China